Lallemantia iberica, known commonly as dragon's head, is a species of flowering plant in the mint family, Lamiaceae.

The plant has been cultivated for its seeds in southwestern Asia and southeastern Europe since prehistoric times. Its vernacular name in Iran is balangu shahri. The seeds contain the edible oil known as lallemantia oil. The oil content of the seeds is about 30%, sometimes reaching up to 38%. The oil is used as a substitute for linseed oil in the production of varnish, furniture polish, ink, paint, soap, and linoleum.

Lallemantia iberica is famous for use in traditional medicines. This plant, originally from the Caucasus and the Middle East, spread throughout European and eastern countries.

The seeds have been used in folk medicine as a stimulant and diuretic. The leaves are used as a potherb in modern Iran.

The toothed or serrated leaves are in opposite pairs at the stem nodes. They are pollinated by insects.

This species can escape cultivation and become a weed.

Balanguseed mucilage (BSM) features many advantages over most of its polymer counterparts, including a lower production cost, higher efficiency, and better medicinal properties.

References

Lamiaceae